Kamil Syprzak (born 23 July 1991) is a Polish handball player for Paris Saint-Germain and the Polish national team.

Career
Syprzak started his career at Orlen Wisła Płock, where he won the Polish Championship in 2011. On 9 June 2015, he joined FC Barcelona. On 22 February 2019, it was stated that he will be playing for Paris Saint-Germain in the next season.

National team
On 1 February 2015, Poland, including Syprzak, won the bronze medal of the 2015 World Championship. In the winning bronze medal match (29:28) against Spain, he threw last goal for Poland in extra time. He also participated at the 2016 Summer Olympics in Rio de Janeiro, in the men's handball tournament.

Achievements

Club

Barcelona
 Spanish league: 2016, 2017, 2018
  Spanish Cup: 2016, 2017, 2018
 Spanish super cup: 2016, 2017, 2018

PSG
 French league: 2020, 2021, 2022
 French cup: 2021, 2022

Sporting achievements

State awards
 2015  Silver Cross of Merit

Individual awards 

 All-Star Team as Best Line player of EHF Champions League: 2022

References

External links

1991 births
Living people
Sportspeople from Płock
Polish male handball players
Wisła Płock (handball) players
FC Barcelona Handbol players
Liga ASOBAL players
Expatriate handball players
Polish expatriate sportspeople in France
Polish expatriate sportspeople in Spain
Handball players at the 2016 Summer Olympics
Olympic handball players of Poland